Tuff E Nuff, known in Japan as , is a 1993 fighting game developed and released by Jaleco for the Super Nintendo Entertainment System.

Gameplay

The game can be played with one to two players. The game starts off with only four characters, but a Boss Code can unlock the other seven characters. The game has three modes: Story Mode, 1-Player to CPU Mode (fighting against each boss individually, except the last one), and Multiplayer Mode. The fighting system is based on buttons: two for kicks and two for punches (light and fierce, respectively). All characters have at least two special attacks. In all modes, the more life anyone loses, the more bloody the characters' faces become, much like in SNK's Art of Fighting series; however, like the final epilogues of the main characters, were removed from the North American and European versions.

There are ten stages in story mode, where either Kotono, Syoh, Vortz and Zazi fight. After picking a character, the player must fight the other three in a tournament-style fashion. After fighting the other heroes, the player must fight the six guards leading to Jado. After fighting Jado, there is an ending sequence (only in the Japanese version) followed by a screen saying to go to hard mode, or a congratulations for the completion of beating hard mode. After beating hard mode, the closing credits show a clip of the players' battles with the enemies faced. The four main characters' skills evolve over story mode, featuring an RPG-like element, meaning their special moves become slightly larger and more powerful after each group of opponents are defeated.

Plot
The story is set in a post-apocalyptic Earth in the year AD 2151. To the inhabitants on Earth it seems like the only chance for a decent life is to fight, in a "survival of the fittest" scenario. A man named Jado finds a powerful blue fighting armor and calls himself "The Fighting King". With it, he quickly gains control of the world. Using his newfound power, he erects a tower with six guards. Many try to take Jado's power away, but they die in their attempt. Some weeks after the building of the tower, a tournament is held all over the world to see who is the strongest. Of the many fighters, only four people are chosen. Now they need to fight each other to see who is going in the tower. The plot dialogues of the Story mode and the final epilogues were excluded from the North American and European versions.

Characters
Playable characters:
   - A 22-year-old street brawler from Hokkaidō, Japan, his fighting style is called Tenga Haouryuu (Heavenly Claw). His motive was to finish the fight with Zazi, which was interrupted when the Great War started.
   - A 22-year-old rival of Syoh from the United States, his fighting style is Chisou Haouryuu (Earth Claw). He is a head swap of Syoh.
   - A 19-year-old female ninja from Kyoto, Japan, her fighting style is Kuki Shindenryu Ninjutsu. A master of sword fighting, she uses kunai throwing knives and kick attacks. Her motive is revenge on Jado, who killed her father.
   - A 31-year-old professional wrestler from the Netherlands, nicknamed "Shishio" (King of Beasts). His fighting style features several slamming moves. He is searching for someone nobody knows.

CPU opponents:
   - A 25-year-old  punk and street fighting champion from Bronx, New York.
   - A 34-year-old former Libyan military commander, now an assassin and mercenary who fights with a large knife and a rocket launcher.
   - A 19-year-old kenpō expert and magician from Japan. She has the ability to summon spirits which aid her in combat.
   - A 28-year-old pro wrestler. Gajet once accidentally killed an opponent and was barred from the sport, only to discover that he liked killing. It is assumed he and Vortz were once friends, but in the Japanese ending for Vortz (this and the endings for the other characters were removed from the international releases for unknown reasons), it is revealed that the two are in fact brothers.
   -  An extremely fast and agile ninja from Japan. His fighting style is Iga Ninjutsu and he uses a sword and magic attacks.
   - A 29-year-old cyborg from Germany. His weapon of choice is his bionic arms, which gives him good range on attacks.
   - The self-proclaimed Fighting King and the game's final boss.

Release
The original Japanese cover art to Dead Dance/Tuff E Nuff is taken from an issue cover of the UK gaming magazine Computer and Video Games. CVG created the artwork for their preview feature as there was none available at the time. Jaleco were so impressed with the design, they asked CVG to make it the official artwork for the game. It appears on the Japanese and European versions of the game. Jaleco USA decided to use their own box art instead for the American release which is often considered to be one of the worst designs for a video game of all time.  It can be seen in the first level of the original arcade version of Jaleco's Game Tengoku.

Tuff E Nuff was added to the Nintendo Switch Online subscription service in December 2020.

Reception
The game received positive reviews from Super NES Buyer's Guide. Martin Alessi called Tuff E Nuff one of the best Street Fighter II clones on the SNES, giving it a score of 81%; Howard Grossman gave it 78%. A review in Super Play ranked Dead Dance as the second best beat'em up on the SNES, having dethroned the previous second choice, Fatal Fury. Jonathan Davies gave it a score of 78%, calling it "a pretty good beat'em up with plenty of depth and challenging gameplay. Ultimately, though, it's not as good as Street Fighter II." Power Unlimited gave the game a score of 85% commenting: "Tuff Enuff is one of the fighting games that jumped in on the Streetfighter II craze. Special moves were therefore almost identical to that game. Fortunately, it was just as fast and beautiful, so it was definitely worth it for fans.

References

External links

Official website 

1993 video games
Jaleco games
Multiplayer and single-player video games
Video games about ninja
Post-apocalyptic video games
Science fiction video games
Super Nintendo Entertainment System games
Fighting games
Video games developed in Japan
Video games featuring female protagonists
Nintendo Switch Online games